{{DISPLAYTITLE:C22H30O}}
The molecular formula C22H30O (molar mass: 310.47 g/mol, exact mass: 310.2297 u) may refer to:

 Desogestrel
 ERA-63, or ORG-37663

Molecular formulas